Habrosyne costalis is a moth in the family Drepanidae. It is found in the Philippines (Luzon).

References

Moths described in 1921
Thyatirinae